The Bronze Derby rivalry was an American college football rivalry game played between Presbyterian College and Newberry College. The teams first met in 1913, when they played two games in a row against each other on October 29 and November 7. Newberry won both of these meetings 51–0. Presbyterian and Newberry played each other every year from 1913 to 2006 (with the exception of 1914 and 1918), when Presbyterian left the SAC to join the Big South.

Game results

See also  
 List of NCAA college football rivalry games

References

College football rivalries in the United States
Newberry Wolves football
Presbyterian Blue Hose football
1913 establishments in South Carolina
Dissolved sports rivalries